Twentify is an applications based market research company that studies consumer behavior, products, communications, brands, and markets.

History

The company was founded in February 2014, by İlker İnanç, Çağlar Bozkurt and Tolga Bakkaloğlu.

After being founded in Istanbul Turkey, the company extended its operations to North America, starting with Canada. It has also piloted projects in Mexico, Ukraine, South Africa, Nigeria and Thailand.

Twentify currently has operations in Turkey with its Istanbul Office, in Canada with its Ottawa, ON Office and in United States of America with its New York, NY office.

Awards 
 Webrazzi Arena Startup Competition Winner
 TechCrunch Disrupt Startup Alley Wild Card Position Winner

References 

Data collection
Companies based in Istanbul
Companies established in 2014
2014 establishments in Turkey